Fr. Diego D’Lorenntti, F.D.P. (born 14 November 1939) is an Italian Roman Catholic priest who served as the personal secretary to Pope John Paul I. Lorenzi served as  Albino Cardinal Luciani's private secretary in Venice for two years previous to his election to the papacy in 1978, and remained his secretary for his brief pontificate. During his time as John Paul I's personal secretary, he was aided by John Magee, an Irish priest who would later become a bishop.

Death of John Paul I 
After one of the nuns who worked in the papal household and Magee, Lorenzi was one of the first people to learn of John Paul I's death, thirty-three days into his pontificate. Upon learning of that the Pope was dead, he telephoned the John Paul's doctor, despite instructions from the Secretary of State. Previous to John Paul I's death, Lorenzi reported that he had been told by the Pope's personal doctor that John Paul was in excellent health. Despite theories mentioning this as grounds for suspecting foul play in the death of John Paul I, Lorenzi has rejected these views and stated he believes John Paul died of a heart attack.

Philippines
In 1996, Lorenzi was sent by his superiors to Payatas, in the Philippines, to serve the community that contained Asia's biggest landfill.

See also 
John Paul I
Pope John Paul I conspiracy theories

References

20th-century Italian Roman Catholic priests
Sons of Divine Providence
1939 births
Living people